Louise Pleming (born 22 June 1967) is an Australian former professional tennis player who participated in both the ITF Circuit and the WTA Tour.

Background
Pleming was born in Wagga Wagga, NSW, Australia.  She began to play tennis for fun when she was six years old. She attended the Vic Edwards Tennis School.  In 1982 she began playing professionally.

Championships
Pleming played in 11 championships between 1991 and 2001. Out of a total 17 matches played, she won four (three in doubles, one in singles). She won 177 games, lost 239 games; won four tie-breaks and lost three tie-breaks. Her highest singles ranking was 290 in 1996 and her highest doubles ranking was 87 in 1998.

Achievements
In 2006 Tennis Australia appointed her a national touring coach. A year later she was the captain of the Australian Junior Fed Cup team that won. In 1999, she played the World Team Tennis with Martina Navratilova for the New York Buzz team. Between 1998–2002 she was an expert commentator for the Hopman Cup on ABC and Foxport.

Retirement
Even after Pleming retired from playing tennis professionally, she remained active in the industry. She is a tennis television commentator for Australian Channel 7 and an AIS Pro Tour Program Women's Program Coach. She works alongside Victorian Sally Peers and Queenslander Monika Wejnert. She is a commentator on the TV Series ‘Wimbledon’ which is the BBC's live coverage of the Wimbledon Tennis Championships at the All England Club. She coaches privately in the inner Eastern suburbs area.

As a coach, Pleming is known "to be vocal during matches and she likes to repeatedly offer encouragement to all her players."

In November 2020 she was instrumental in the setting up of RALLY4EVER, a charity which aims to create bridges between the tennis world and disadvantaged and homeless Australians, especially those with mental health problems.

WTA career finals

Doubles: 1 (runner-up)

ITF finals

Doubles: 25 (10–15)

References

External links
 
 
 

Australian female tennis players
1967 births
Living people
Tennis people from New South Wales
Tennis commentators
20th-century Australian women